Pidgley is a surname. Notable people with the surname include: 

Ollie Pidgley (born 1997), British racing driver
Tony Pidgley (1947–2020), English businessman

See also
 Pidley